High energy astronomy is the study of astronomical objects that release electromagnetic radiation of highly energetic wavelengths.  It includes X-ray astronomy, gamma-ray astronomy,  extreme UV astronomy, neutrino astronomy, and studies of cosmic rays.  The physical study of these phenomena is referred to as high-energy astrophysics.

Astronomical objects commonly studied in this field may include black holes, neutron stars, active galactic nuclei, supernovae, kilonovae,  supernova remnants, and gamma ray bursts.

Missions
Some space and ground-based telescopes that have studied high energy astronomy include the following:

 AGILE
 AMS-02
 AUGER
 CALET
 Chandra
 Fermi
 HAWC
 H.E.S.S.
 IceCube
 INTEGRAL
 MAGIC
 NuSTAR
 Swift
 TA
 XMM-Newton
 VERITAS

References

External links
NASA's High Energy Astrophysics Science Archive Research Center

Observational astronomy